Archdiocese of Mandalay is located in the central part of Myanmar. The archdiocese has the suffragan dioceses of Myitkyina, Banmaw, Lashio and Hakha. Most of the Myanmar people are Buddhist. A few are Muslims and Hindus. Ethnic groups in the city include Myanmar, Kayin, Karen, Tamil and Chinese. The language used in the diocesan territory is Myanmar.

Ordinaries 

Marco Tin Win was installed as archbishop on 23 June 2019.
Bourdon (1872–1887)
Simon (1888–1893)
Usse (1893–1902)
Cardos (1902–1906)
Foulquier (1906–1930)
Joseph U Win (1955–1965)
Aloysius U Ba Khin (1965–1978)
Alphonse U Than Aung (1978–2002)
Paul Zingtung Grawng (2003–2014)
Nicholas Mang Thang (2014–2019)
Marco Tin Win (2019–present)

Statistics 
As of 2004, Mandalay diocese had 22,511 Catholics in 30 parishes, representing 00.2% of the 15 million people in Mandalay, Sagaing and Magwe Regions.

References

External links
Mandalay Catholic Youth Commission
Archdiocese of Mandalay

Mandalay
Mandalay
Mandalay
1872 establishments in Burma